The House Under the Water is a British historical television drama series which originally aired on BBC One in eight parts during 1961. It is an adaptation of the 1932 novel The House Under the Water by Francis Brett Young, which portrays the late nineteenth century flooding of the Elan Valley in Wales to create a water supply for the rapidly growing city of Birmingham.

All eight episodes are now considered to be lost.

Cast
 Margaret Courtenay as Lucrezia Tregaron (8 episodes)
 Richard Bebb as Evan Vaughan (8 episodes)
 Carole Mowlam as Philippa Tregaron (8 episodes) 
 Emrys James as Rob Tregaron (8 episodes)
 William Squire as Griffith Tregaron (7 episodes) 
 Ray Smith as Gerald Tregaron (7 episodes)
 Hira Talfrey as Caterina (7 episodes)
 Lesley Lloyd as Virginia Tregaron (6 episodes)
 Aubrey Richards as  Abel Pugh (6 episodes)
 Annest Williams as  Diana Tregaron (5 episodes)
 Patricia Mort as  Janet Delahaye (5 episodes)
 Arnold Bell as  Sir Trevor Delahaye (4 episodes)
 David Lyn as  Charles Lingen (4 episodes)
 June Lewis as  Sula Meredith (4 episodes)
 David Lawton as Louis Wiener (4 episodes)
 Hubert Rees as  Esmond Delahaye (3 episodes)
 D.L. Davies as  Meredith (2 episodes)
 Ian Colin as  Sir Arthur Weldon (2 episodes)
 Edward Evans as Mr. Barradale (2 episodes)
 Ieuan Rhys Williams as  Mr. Prosser (2 episodes)
 Otto Diamant as  Otto Wiener (2 episodes)
 T.H. Evans as  Man at the Inn (1 episode)
 Ivor Maddox as Stockbroker (1 episode)
 Emrys Cleaver as  Man at the Inn (1 episode) 
 W.H. Williams as Man at the Inn (1 episode)
 Prysor Williamsa s  Sergeant Ambrose (1 episode)
 John Gill as Mr. Verona (1 episode)
 Desmond Llewelyn as Colonel Tregaron (1 episode)
 Conrad Evans as  Mr. Parry (1 episode)
 Frederick Schiller as  Mr. Dagmar (1 episode)

References

Bibliography
Ellen Baskin. Serials on British Television, 1950-1994. Scolar Press, 1996.

External links
 

BBC television dramas
1961 British television series debuts
1961 British television series endings
English-language television shows